The Granary Burying Ground in Massachusetts is the city of Boston's third-oldest cemetery, founded in 1660 and located on Tremont Street. It is the final resting place for many notable Revolutionary War-era patriots, including Paul Revere, the five victims of the Boston Massacre, and three signers of the Declaration of Independence: Samuel Adams, John Hancock, and Robert Treat Paine. The cemetery has 2,345 grave-markers, but historians estimate that as many as 5,000 people are buried in it. The cemetery is adjacent to Park Street Church, behind the Boston Athenaeum and immediately across from Suffolk University Law School. It is a site on Boston's Freedom Trail.

The cemetery's Egyptian revival gate and fence were designed by architect Isaiah Rogers (1800–1869), who designed  an identical gate for Newport's Touro Cemetery.

History
The Burying Ground was the third cemetery established in the city of Boston and dates to 1660. The need for the site arose because the land set aside for the city's first cemetery—King's Chapel Burying Ground, located a block east—was insufficient to meet the city's growing population. The area was known as the South Burying Ground until 1737, at which point it took on the name of the granary building which stood on the site of the present-day Park Street Church. In May 1830, trees were planted in the area and an attempt was made to change the name to "Franklin Cemetery" to honor the family of Benjamin Franklin, but the effort failed.

The Burying Ground was originally part of the Boston Common, which then encompassed the entire block. The southwest portion of the block was taken for public buildings two years after the cemetery was established, which included the Granary and a house of correction, and the north portion of the block was used for housing.

Tombs were initially placed near the back of the property. Puritan churches did not believe in religious icons or imagery, so the people of Boston used tombstones as an outlet for artistic expression of their beliefs about the afterlife. One of the most popular motifs was the "Soul Effigy," a skull or "death’s head" with a wing on each side that was a representation of the soul flying to heaven after death. On May 15, 1717, a vote was passed by the town to enlarge the Burying Ground by taking part of the highway on the eastern side (now Tremont Street). The enlargement was carried out in 1720 when 15 tombs were created and assigned to a number of Boston families.

Eleven large European elms fronted it on Tremont Street. The elms were planted in 1762 by Major Adino Paddock and John Ballard and reached ten feet in circumference by 1856. The walk under the elms was known as "Paddock's Mall," while the rest of the grounds were devoid of any trees at all. The first major improvement was undertaken in 1830, when a number of trees were planted around the grounds. The property was improved again in 1840 by the construction of an iron fence on Tremont Street. The fence was designed by Boston architect Isaiah Rogers at a cost of $5,000, half paid by the city and half by public subscription.  Rogers designed an identical Egyptian revival gateway for Newport's Touro Cemetery.

In January 2009, a previously unknown crypt was discovered when a tourist on a self-guided tour through the cemetery fell through the ground into what appeared to be a stairway leading to a crypt. The stairway had been covered with a piece of slate which eventually gave way due to advanced age. (The tourist was not hurt, nor did she come into contact with any human remains.) The crypt is reported to be 8 by 12 feet and is structurally intact. It is possibly the resting place of Jonathan Armitage, a Boston selectman from 1732 to 1733. Officials from the City of Boston announced in May, 2011 a $300,000 refurbishment project designed to repair and restore the historic site, including widening paths in the cemetery and providing new observation sites: $125,000 will be provided by the Freedom Trail Foundation and the city will pay the rest.

Memorials and monuments
Prominently displayed in the Burying Ground is an obelisk erected in 1827 to the parents and relatives of Benjamin Franklin who was born in Boston and is buried in Philadelphia. Franklin's father was Josiah Franklin, originally from Ecton, Northamptonshire, England, and his mother was Abiah, who was born in Nantucket and was Josiah's second wife. Constructed of granite from the Bunker Hill Monument quarry, the obelisk was constructed to replace the original Franklin family gravestones which had been in poor condition. The new memorial was dedicated on 15 June 1827.

The second oldest memorial in the yard lies near the Franklin monument memorializing John Wakefield, aged 52 who died 18 June 1667. The reason(s) for the seven-year gap between the establishment of the burying ground and the oldest memorial are unknown.  The oldest stone is that of the Neal Children, carved by the 'Charlestown Carver' dating to 1666.

Near the Tremont Street entrance are interred the American casualties in the Boston Massacre which occurred 5 March 1770. The grave markers were moved during the 1800s to be in straight lines, to conform to nineteenth century ideas of order, as well as to allow for more modern groundskeeping (i.e., the lawn mower).

Notable burials

 Samuel Adams (1722–1803), statesman, signer of the Declaration of Independence
 Crispus Attucks (1723–1770), African-American victim of the Boston Massacre, in a common grave with the other four victims and Christopher Seider (sometimes Snider), a boy killed 11 days before
 James Bowdoin (1726–1790), prominent merchant, 2nd Governor of Massachusetts
 Rev Mather Byles (1706–1788), prominent minister and loyalist in Tomb No. 2; other members of his family buried here are daughters Mrs. Elizabeth [Byles] Brown; Miss Mary Byles; Miss Catherine Byles
 John Endecott (c. 1588–1665), First Governor of Massachusetts Bay Colony (his grave stone has been destroyed and for many years it was thought – erroneously – that he was buried in the King’s Chapel Burying Ground. But recent evidence has proven conclusively that he was buried in tomb 189 of the Granary Burying Ground)
 Peter Faneuil (1700–1743), benefactor of Faneuil Hall
 Members of Benjamin Franklin's family, but not Franklin himself, who is buried in Philadelphia, Pennsylvania.
 Mary Goose (1665–1758), an unlikely claim familiar to locals as being the original Mother Goose (some Mother Goose stories long predate the 17th century, the name Mother Goose was already familiar in France in 1650, and the first public appearance of Mother Goose stories in the New World was in 1786).
 Jeremiah Gridley (1702–1767), lawyer, defender of writs of assistance in 1761
 John Hancock (1737–1793), statesman, signer of the Declaration of Independence
 John Hull, Judith Quincy Hull, Daniel Quincy; Hull-Quincy Tomb (Tomb 185)
 James Otis Jr. (1725–1783), lawyer, Revolutionary War Patriot
 Robert Treat Paine (1731–1814), signer of the Declaration of Independence
 Ebenezer Pemberton (1746–1835), American educator
 John Phillips (1770–1823), first mayor of the city of Boston
 Wendell Phillips (1811–1884), American abolitionist, advocate for Native Americans, orator, and attorney (reburied at Milton Cemetery in 1886)
 Edward Rawson (1615–1693), first secretary of the Massachusetts Bay Colony (1650–1686)
 Paul Revere (1735–1818), silversmith, Revolutionary War Patriot
 Christopher Seider (1758–1770), boy killed by a loyalist customs agent less than two weeks before the Boston Massacre
 Samuel Sewall (1652–1730) Salem witch trials judge
 John Smibert (1688–1751) Scottish-American artist
 Cyprian Southack (1662–1745), cartographer and naval commander
 Increase Sumner (1746–1799), Fifth Governor of Massachusetts
 Nathan Webb, (1705–1772), pastored the first new Congregational Church in Massachusetts started during the Great Awakening period for over 41 years
 The master of Phillis Wheatley (1753–1784), American slave and first African-American poet and first African-American woman to publish a book; the resting place of Wheatley herself is the Copp's Hill Burying Ground, in the North End of Boston.
 Benjamin Woodbridge (1708–1728), victim of the first duel fought in Boston

Gallery

See also

 Central burying ground
 Copp's Hill Burying Ground
 Funerary art in Puritan New England
 King's Chapel burying ground
 List of cemeteries in Boston, Massachusetts

Citations

General sources

External links

 
  City of Boston Site
 
 C-SPAN American History TV Tour of Granary Burying Ground – Part 1
 C-SPAN American History TV Tour of Granary Burying Ground – Part 2

1660 establishments in Massachusetts
Buildings and structures completed in 1660
Cemeteries in Financial District, Boston
Samuel Adams